The 191st New York State Legislature, consisting of the New York State Senate and the New York State Assembly, met from January 4, 1995, to December 31, 1996, during the first and second years of George Pataki's governorship, in Albany.

Background
Under the provisions of the New York Constitution of 1938 and the U.S. Supreme Court decision to follow the One man, one vote rule, re-apportioned in 1992 by the Legislature, 61 Senators and 150 assemblymen were elected in single-seat districts for two-year terms. Senate and Assembly districts consisted of approximately the same number of inhabitants, the area being apportioned contiguously without restrictions regarding county boundaries.

At this time there were two major political parties: the Republican Party and the Democratic Party. The Conservative Party, the Independence Party, the Liberal Party, the Right to Life Party, the Tax Cut Now Party, the Libertarian Party and the Socialist Workers Party also nominated tickets.

Elections
The New York state election, 1994, was held on November 8. State Senator George Pataki was elected Governor, and Betsy McCaughey Ross was elected Lieutenant Governor, both Republicans with Conservative and Tax Cut Now endorsement, who defeated the incumbent Democrats Mario Cuomo and Stan Lundine. The elections to the other three statewide elective offices resulted in the re-election of State Comptroller Carl McCall and U.S. Senator Daniel Patrick Moynihan, both Democrats; and the election of Dennis Vacco as Attorney General, a Republican with Conservative endorsement who defeated the incumbent Democrat G. Oliver Koppell. The approximate party strength at this election, as expressed by the vote for Governor, was: Democrats 2,273,000; Republicans 2,156,000; Conservatives 329,000; Independence 217,000; Liberals 92,000; Right to Life 68,000; Tax Cut Now 54,000; Libertarians 9,500; and Socialist Workers 5,500.

36 of the sitting 39 women members of the legislature—State Senators Nancy Larraine Hoffmann (Dem.), of Syracuse; Mary Ellen Jones (Democrat), of Irondequoit; Olga A. Méndez (Democrat), of East Harlem; Velmanette Montgomery (Democrat), of Brooklyn; Suzi Oppenheimer (Dem.), of Mamaroneck; Mary Lou Rath (Republican), of Williamsville; Nellie R. Santiago (Democrat), of Brooklyn; and Ada L. Smith (Dem.), of Queens; and Assemblywomen Patricia Acampora (Republican), of Mattituck; Carmen E. Arroyo (Democrat), of the Bronx; Nancy Calhoun (Republican), of Blooming Grove; Joan Christensen (Democrat), of Syracuse; Barbara M. Clark (Democrat), of Queens; Elizabeth Connelly (Dem.), of Staten Island; Vivian E. Cook (Dem.) of Queens; RoAnn Destito (Democrat), of Rome; Gloria Davis (Dem.), of the Bronx; Eileen C. Dugan (Democrat), of Brooklyn; Donna Ferrara (Rep.), a lawyer of Westbury; Sandy Galef (Democrat), of Ossining; Deborah J. Glick (Dem.), of Manhattan; Aurelia Greene (Dem.), of the Bronx; Audrey Hochberg (Dem.), of Scarsdale; Elizabeth C. Hoffman (Republican), of North Tonawanda; Earlene Hill Hooper (Dem.), of Hempstead; Rhoda S. Jacobs (Democrat), of Brooklyn; Susan V. John (Dem.), of Rochester; Melinda Katz (Dem.), a lawyer of Queens; Naomi C. Matusow (Democrat), a lawyer of Armonk; Nettie Mayersohn (Democrat), of Queens; Patricia McGee (Republican), of Franklinville; Catherine Nolan (Dem.), of Queens; Chloe Ann O'Neil (Republican), an elementary school teacher of Parishville; Audrey Pheffer (Democrat), of Queens; Frances T. Sullivan (Republican), of Fulton; and Helene Weinstein (Democrat), a lawyer of Brooklyn—were re-elected. Catherine M. Abate (Democrat), of Manhattan, was also elected to the State Senate. Debra J. Mazzarelli (Republican), of Patchogue; and Sandra Lee Wirth (Republican), of West Seneca, were also elected to the Assembly.

The New York state election, 1995, was held on November 7. Four vacancies in the Assembly were filled. Betty Little (Republican), of Queensbury, was elected to fill one of the vacancies.

Sessions
The Legislature met for the first regular session (the 218th) at the State Capitol in Albany on January 4, 1995; and recessed indefinitely in the morning of June 30.

Sheldon Silver (Dem.) was re-elected Speaker of the Assembly.

Joseph Bruno (Rep.) was elected Temporary President of the Senate.

The Legislature met for the second regular session (the 219th) at the State Capitol in Albany on January 3, 1996; and recessed indefinitely on July 13.

The Legislature met for a special session from December 17 to 18, 1996, to consider legislation concerning the administration of the public school system in New York City.

State Senate

Senators
The asterisk (*) denotes members of the previous Legislature who continued in office as members of this Legislature. Vincent Leibell changed from the Assembly to the Senate at the beginning of this legislature. Assemblymen Larry Seabrook and James S. Alesi were elected to fill vacancies in the Senate.

Note: For brevity, the chairmanships omit the words "...the Committee on (the)..."

Employees
 Secretary: Stephen F. Sloan

State Assembly

Assembly members
The asterisk (*) denotes members of the previous Legislature who continued in office as members of this Legislature.

Note: For brevity, the chairmanships omit the words "...the Committee on (the)..."

Employees
 Clerk: Francine Misasi

Notes

Sources
 Senate and Assembly members (Vote on the Budget Bill, on March 9, 1995)

191
1995 establishments in New York (state)
1996 disestablishments in New York (state)
1995 politics in New York (state)
1996 politics in New York (state)
1995 U.S. legislative sessions
1996 U.S. legislative sessions